The World Rugby Women’s 15s Breakthrough Player of the Year is an award given annually by World Rugby at the World Rugby Awards. The award was first presented in 2022 in partnership with Tudor and was won by New Zealand's Ruby Tui.

Winner and nominees

References

External links 

 World Rugby Awards

World Rugby Awards